Peter Campbell John Curtis (8 September 19295 May 2013) was an Australian public servant and diplomat.

Curtis was born on 8 September 1929. He grew up in Sydney, attending Riverview College and later the University of Sydney, before going on to study at the University of Oxford in the United Kingdom.

In 1957, Curtis joined the Department of External Affairs.

Curtis' first ambassadorial posting was to Laos in 1969. Returning to Canberra in 1972, Curtis was appointed assistant secretary of the Personnel Branch of the Department of Foreign Affairs (the external affairs department's name had been changed in 1970). In the role he led a property acquisition trip to Hanoi in advance of establishing a mission in Vietnam.

He was appointed Ambassador to Lebanon, Syria, Iraq and Jordan in 1975. The posting was based in Beirut.

From 1976 to 1979, Curtis was Australian High Commissioner to India and Nepal.

In 1982, Curtis was appointed Australian Ambassador to France.

References

1929 births
2013 deaths
Ambassadors of Australia to Belgium
Ambassadors of Australia to France
Ambassadors of Australia to Morocco
Ambassadors of Australia to Iraq
Ambassadors of Australia to Jordan
Ambassadors of Australia to Laos
Ambassadors of Australia to Lebanon
Ambassadors of Australia to Nepal
Ambassadors of Australia to Syria
High Commissioners of Australia to India
Consuls-General of Australia in New York
Australian National University alumni
Alumni of the University of Oxford